The Evolution of the Conservation Movement, 1850–1920 is an online exhibition from the Library of Congress' American Memory series. It documents the historical formation and cultural foundations of the movement to conserve and protect America's natural heritage, through books, pamphlets, government documents, manuscripts, prints, photographs, and motion picture footage drawn from the collections of the Library of Congress.

The collection consists of 62 books and pamphlets, 140 Federal statutes and Congressional resolutions, 34 additional legislative documents, excerpts from the Congressional Globe and the Congressional Record, 360 Presidential proclamations, 170 prints and photographs, 2 historic manuscripts, and 2 motion pictures.

See also
Conservation in the United States

External links
The Library of Congress - The Evolution of the Conservation Movement, 1850-1920

Environmental non-fiction books
Cultural history of the United States
Nature conservation in the United States
Digital library projects
19th century in the United States
1910s in the United States
1920s in the United States